The 1988 Utah State Aggies football team represented Utah State University during the 1988 NCAA Division I-A football season as a member of the Big West Conference. The Aggies were led by third-year head coach Chuck Shelton and played their home games at Romney Stadium in Logan, Utah. They finished the season with a record of four wins and seven losses (4–7, 4–3 Big West).

Schedule

References

Utah State
Utah State Aggies football seasons
Utah State Aggies football